An autonomic ganglion is a cluster of nerve cell bodies (a ganglion) in the autonomic nervous system. The two types are the sympathetic ganglion and the parasympathetic ganglion.

References 

 
Autonomic nervous system